Dumitru Dumitriu (born 19 November 1945 in Bucharest), commonly known as Țiți Dumitru or Dumitriu III, is a retired Romanian footballer and coach. He is the younger brother of Emil Dumitriu (Dumitriu II) who was an International footballer and champion of Romania with Rapid București and the elder brother of Constantin Dumitriu (Dumitriu IV) who won the Romanian championship with Steaua București.

Playing career
Dumitriu started his youth career with Rapid București and made his senior career debut with Metalul Târgoviște in 1964. After a year, he moved to ASA Târgu Mureș, where he spent three years. In 1968, he signed with Steaua București, where he played until 1972. In the same year he joined Bucharest city rivals Rapid București. He also played for Olimpia Satu Mare, FCM Galați and ICSIM București.

He won a cap for Romania in 1967.

Coaching career
After he quit playing in 1977, he became quickly a player/manager for ICSIM București, amongst others in the beginning he managed lower league sides such as Rapid Fetești, Autobuzul București, Steaua Mizil, and Rulmentul Bârlad.

The highlight of his career as a manager was with Steaua București, qualifying them three times in a row in the UEFA Champions League and also winning the Romanian First League in 1995, 1996 and 1997. In 1999 and 2005 he won the championship again, this time with Rapid București and then with FCSB, leading him to a total of 5 championships won. He also guided Steaua to two Romanian Cups in 1996 and 1997, and two Romanian Supercups in 1994 and 1995.

In 1994, he was the assistant coach to Anghel Iordănescu in the 1994 FIFA World Cup.

In the 1997–98 season he reached the Cup Winners' Cup quarter-finals as AEK Athens FC manager, losing a semi-final place to Lokomotiv Moscow in the last minute of the second leg match.

Honours

Player
Steaua București
Romanian Cup (3): 1968–69, 1969–70, 1970–71

Manager
Steaua București
Romanian First League (3): 1994–95, 1995–96, 1996–97
Romanian Cup (2): 1995–96, 1996–97
Romanian Supercup (2): 1994, 1995

Rapid București
Romanian First League (1): 1998–99

Rocar București
Romanian Cup runner-up (1):  2000–01

FCSB
Romanian First League (1): 2004–05

Notes
 The 1965–1966 appearances and goals made for ASA Târgu Mureş are unavailable.
 The 1966–1967 appearances made for ASA Târgu Mureş are unavailable.

References

External links
 
 
 Dumitru Dumitriu profile  at SteauaFC.com 

Living people
1945 births
Footballers from Bucharest
Romanian footballers
Association football midfielders
FC Rapid București players
FC Olimpia Satu Mare players
CSA Steaua București footballers
Liga I players
Romania international footballers
Romanian expatriate football managers
Romanian football managers
AFC Dacia Unirea Brăila players
Apollon Limassol FC managers
AEK Athens F.C. managers
CSA Steaua București managers
FC Steaua București managers
FC Rapid București managers
FC Politehnica Timișoara managers
ASC Oțelul Galați managers
AFC Rocar București managers
Panionios F.C. managers
A.P.O. Akratitos Ano Liosia managers
FCM Bacău managers
FC Bihor Oradea managers
CSM Ceahlăul Piatra Neamț managers
Expatriate football managers in Cyprus
Expatriate football managers in Greece
Romanian expatriate sportspeople in Cyprus